Zoe Freney is a South Australian artist, arts writer and arts educator. She and her husband, Martin Freney, have also built Australia’s first council-approved Earthship.

Biography 

Freney has a Diploma of Visual Art from Adelaide Central School of Art (2005), a Bachelor of Visual Art from Adelaide Centre for the Arts (2006), and a Master in Art History from the University of Adelaide (2010). Freney lectures in art history at Adelaide Central School of Art.

As an arts writer, she has written several catalogue essays and reviews (see Bibliography) and in 2017, she was one of four artists (including Daniel Connell) who travelled to India as part of a South Australian Government Arts Engagement Program.

She is married to Martin Freney and they have two sons. Together, they built a strawbale house and followed this by building Australia’s first council-approved Earthship, Earthship Ironbank, which they rent out as a B&B.

Artistic style and subject 

Freney is a painter whose paintings examine motherhood and often feature herself as model, as seen in the group exhibition, Good Mother, her solo exhibition, Motherology, and the group exhibition, Labors: An Exhibition Exploring the Complexities of Motherhood at Pearl Conard Gallery, Ohio State University (2018).

Awards and prizes 

She has been a finalist in the Heysen Landscape Art Prize (2018), the Prospect Portrait Prize (2017), the Fleurieu Biennale (2018) and the Emma Hack Art Prize (2017). Freney was also a joint winner of the inaugural Queen of Clubs Art Prize from Peter Lehmann Wines in 2000.

Bibliography 

 Review: Tom Phillips, Suburban Castaway, Art Guide Australia Online, January 2018
 These Four Walls, Catalogue Essay, Jess Mara, Floating Goose, Adelaide, February 2018
 Preview: Confluence, Art Guide Australia Online, September 2017
 Preview: Tarnanthi at JamFactory, Art Guide Australia, print edition, August–September 2017
 Feature: Deidre But-Husaim, bees, curiosity and coincidence, Art Guide Australia Online, July 2017
 Review, Emmaline Zanelli, Art Guide Australia Online, May 2017
 Preview: Both diggers and artists turn shrapnel into art, Art Guide Australia Online, November 2016
 Preview: Artists examine fallout of atomic age in Nuclear, Art Guide Australia Online, August 2016
 Preview: Nine collaborators unravel the elusive thread of art, Art Guide Australia Online, July 2016
 Non-Space generator, Catalogue Essay, Lily Ahlefeldt, CACSA Project Space, July 2016
 Vasari and the Perfect Wife: ‘fempathy’ as a strategic method in teaching art histories and theories,’ ACUADS Conference 2015: Art and Design Education in the Global 24/7, 24–25 September 2015, School of Art, Architecture and Design, University of South Australia

References

External links 
 Personal website
 Earthship Ironbank

Living people
Artists from South Australia
Australian contemporary artists
Artists from Adelaide
20th-century Australian artists
21st-century Australian artists
Australian art teachers
Year of birth missing (living people)